Cikgu Zainon Ismail is a well known writer and also a public speaker. He once served in the Taliban Army, during the Soviet–Afghan War.

Early life and career
Zainon Ismail or fondly known as Cikgu Non was a primary school teacher in Kedah, Malaysia. He served as a teacher in the late 70's and joined politics soon after. He was then involved in many Islamic movements and groups prior to his Jihad service in the Afghanistan wars.

Aftermath of the Memali incident
The nation was in a grip of shocked over the Memali incident where dozens of policeman and cult followers died in a shoot-out. Zainon came back to Malaysia and voluntarily carries the burden to protect and take care of cult members who were widowed after the incident. Zainon was the only PAS leader who were concern about the well being of the widows and children of the tragedy. Other PAS leaders were reluctant to help but collected "Memali fund donation" for their own personal financial gains. Most of the funds were uncounted and distributed evenly to PAS leaders. The widows and children of those who died in the incident did not get even a cent of the said fund. Even Abdul Hadi Awang, the man who started the Memali incident with his Amanat Hadi or Dictum of Hadi Awang was indifferent to the struggle of the widows and orphans of the Memali casualties that he proudly claim as martyrs.

The rise of C.N. Afghani
Zainon Ismail was genuinely concern about the welfare of those who were affected by the incident. he took care of all the orphans by providing money for education, food and shelter. He married one of the widows and run a grocery business. Proceeds of the business is given evenly to all of the widows and orphans. He asked the PAS central committee to give some of the proceeds of the Memali funds to those who are entitled to it. However, his application was denied as most of the money has been spent on political agenda of the party. Zainon Ismail rose up and demanded that PAS was responsible for the Memali incident and should take responsibility. PAS central committee brushes of Zainon and without any explanation regards Zainon as their enemy. Sadden by the act of his comrades, Zainon Ismail wrote a book about the struggles of the widows and orphans of the Memali incident. He used the name C.N. Afghani as his pen name and wrote the truth about PAS and exposes how the Islamic-based party swindled all the donation funds. The book was named Airmata Di Bumi Memali or The Tears of Memali.

Reception of the release
Haji Abdul Hadi Awang stated that the Tears of Memali book should not be read as it is haram. He went further by saying that those who sell, buy, and read the book should be beaten up. In his book C.N. Afghani stated that many of the widows and orphans came up to the point of starving to death, even though millions of ringgit were collected by the PAS central committee using the name and status of the Memali incident victims. The collected money were used to finance the political movement or given to individuals. The open revelation of the book was highly anticipated by both UMNO and PAS members alike. However, PAS leaders were afraid that with the release of the book, it may brought them down to their knees.

Kafirkah Aku? (Am I an Infidel?)
Recently, C.N. Afghani came up with a new book entitled Kafirkah Aku? or Am I an Infidel? which strikes directly at Abdul Hadi Awang. Abdul Hadi once stated in his ceramah and dictum that those who supports and joins UMNO are considered as an infidel. He also said that making political arrangements with non-muslims is prohibited and those who befriended a non- muslim (hitting out at the Barisan Nasional) coalition will be considered as an infidel too.

Kafirkah Aku? hits out at the hypocrisy of Abdul Hadi when DAP, a mainly non-muslim party joined hand-in-hand with PAS as a partner in the Pakatan Rakyat coalition.

References

Living people
Malaysian democracy activists
Malaysian writers
Malaysian Islamists
Malaysian people of Malay descent
Malaysian Muslims
Malaysian Islamic Party politicians
Year of birth missing (living people)